William Caparne  (1855–1940), born William John Caparn, was a British horticulturist and a painter of floral and other subjects. He created the first hybrids in the intermediate bearded iris group, and is thought to have created more than 100 cultivars of bulbous iris.

Life

Caparne was born on 17 November 1855 in Newark-on-Trent, Nottinghamshire. He was the eldest child of William Horner Caparn, an organist and teacher of music, and his wife Sophia Warwick. His grandfather and two of his uncles were seed merchants and his father grew irises. Caparne attended Magnus Grammar School where he had art lessons from the painter, politician and art-master William Cubley of Newark-on-Trent, who had been a pupil of Sir William Beechey, a former pupil of Sir Joshua Reynolds. Caparne taught in an art school from the age of 16, and in 1877 was taken on as drawing-master at Oundle School. In 1879 he married Louisa Jane Atkins. A daughter, Louisa Winifred, was born in 1880, and in the same year he was appointed art master at Oundle.

In 1895 Caparne moved to Guernsey following the death of his wife, where he was to paint for the next 40 years, living in a small cottage on a cliff top in the parish of St Martin between Bon Port and Saints Bay, using an old tram as his workshop. It was during this time that he added an "e" to the end of his surname. Losing his sight three years before his death.

Work
Painting in various media, his subjects were associated with his local environment, the sea, sky and land. Flowers, individual and in groups were common in his works, he was an acknowledged expert in Iris.
The British Iris Society recognised his significant contributions with the award of the Foster Memorial Plaque in 1936. The Foster Memorial Plaque (was named after Sir Michael Foster).

References

1855 births
1940 deaths
19th-century British painters
British male painters
20th-century British painters
British horticulturists
People from Newark-on-Trent
19th-century British male artists
20th-century British male artists